A leadership spill of the federal parliamentary leader of the Liberal Party of Australia was held on 23 May 1994. The incumbent, John Hewson, was defeated by Alexander Downer in a vote of Liberal Party Members of Parliament (MPs) by 43 votes to 36 votes.  Downer thus became the Leader of the Opposition in the Parliament of Australia.

Background

After John Hewson lost the so called unlosable 1993 election he stayed on as Leader of the Opposition despite stating he would resign if he lost.  Hewson stayed on to prevent John Howard being elected leader who Hewson defeated in a 1993 leadership challenge.
However Hewson was undermined over the next 14 months amidst the Liberals having a hard time trying to fundraise and make a momentum against the Keating government and after being embarrassed on Lateline about negative Liberal party polling Hewson called a leadership spill.

Candidates
 Alexander Downer, Shadow Treasurer, Member for Mayo
 John Hewson, incumbent Leader, Member for Wentworth

Potential candidates who declined to run
 Peter Costello, Shadow Minister for Finance, Member for Higgins
 John Howard, Shadow Minister for Industrial Relations, Member for Bennelong

Results

The following table gives the ballot results:

Aftermath
Michael Wooldridge was replaced as Deputy leader by Peter Costello who became Shadow Treasurer. Downer placed Hewson in his shadow ministry as Shadow Minister for Industry, Commerce, Infrastructure and Customs, however after less than three months he was sacked.

References

Liberal Party of Australia leadership spills
Liberal Party of Australia leadership spill
Liberal Party of Australia leadership spill
Liberal Party of Australia leadership spill